The GE C44-8W is a  diesel-electric locomotive built by GE Transportation Systems of Erie, Pennsylvania. It is part of the GE Dash 8 Series of freight locomotives. They are considered to be pre-production Dash 9s with the innards of it but trapped in an extended Dash 8 carbody as well as having the trucks. They are numbered 9000-9052. The first three were originally supposed to be the last order of Dash 8s for CSX thus having the smaller Dash 8 carbody. They have been derated to 4000 horsepower and are now designated C40-9W.

In keeping in GE tradition of giving nicknames to its locomotive series beginning with the "Dash 7" of the 1970s, the C44-8W was dubbed the "Dash 8" upon its debut. The design has since proven popular with North America railroads.

See also
List of GE locomotives

References 

 
 
 

General Electric locomotives
C-C locomotives
Diesel-electric locomotives of the United States